Arthur Roberts (born 1876) was an English footballer who played in the Football League for Stoke.

Career
Roberts played with amateur side Newcastle Casuals in his home town of Newcastle-Under-Lyme before joining Stoke in 1899. He played twice for Stoke during the 1899–1900 season before returning to amateur football with Tunstall Rangers.

Career statistics

References

English footballers
Stoke City F.C. players
English Football League players
1876 births
Year of death missing
Association football inside forwards
Sportspeople from Newcastle-under-Lyme
Date of birth missing